Jamil Khan (born 1 October 1991) is a Pakistani cricketer who plays for Lahore. He made his first-class debut on 2 November 2015 in the 2015–16 Quaid-e-Azam Trophy.

References

External links
 

1991 births
Living people
Pakistani cricketers
Lahore cricketers
Cricketers from Lahore